This is a list of notable German film directors related to the cinema of Germany.

A 
 Alfred Abel
 Willy Achsel
 Herbert Achternbusch
 Robert van Ackeren
 Maren Ade
 Percy Adlon
 Fatih Akin
 Bülent Akinci
 Züli Aladağ
 Hans Albin
 Claudia von Alemann
 Lexi Alexander
 Jürgen von Alten
 Christian Alvart
 Karl Anton
 Thomas Arslan
 Arno Assmann
 Emily Atef

B 
 Aleksander Bach
 Helmuth M. Backhaus
 Jo Baier
 Boleslaw Barlog
 Tevfik Başer
 James Bauer
 Christian Baumeister
 Christopher Becker
 Lars Becker
 Wolfgang Becker (1910–2005)
 Wolfgang Becker (born 1954)
 Gerhard Behrendt
 Hans Behrendt
 Dirk van den Berg
 Edward Berger
 Ludwig Berger
 Curtis Bernhardt
 Hans Bertram
 Andreas Bethmann
 Frank Beyer
 Nico Beyer
 Rudolf Biebrach
 Hans Billian
 Leo Birinski
 Kurt Blachy
 Tabea Blumenschein
 Walter Bockmayer
 Carl Boese
 Bernd Böhlich
 Hark Bohm
 Uwe Boll
 Heinrich Bolten-Baeckers
 Jan Bonny
 Walter Boos
 Detlef Bothe
 Jürgen Böttcher
 John Brahm
 Horst E. Brandt
 Thomas Brasch
 Peter Paul Brauer
 Alfred Braun
 Harald Braun
 Heinrich Breloer
 Matthias Brenner
 Jonatan Briel
 Uta Briesewitz
 Georg Brintrup
 Yvonne Brosch
 Jutta Brückner
 Franziska Buch
 Fritz Peter Buch
 Gerhard T. Buchholz
 Detlev Buck
 Loriot
 Wolfgang Busch
 Norbert Busè
 Jörg Buttgereit

C 
 Ciro Cappellari
 Heiner Carow
 Neco Celik
 Erik Charell
 Maja Classen
 Bastian Clevé
 Volker von Collande
 Constantin J. David
 Ludwig Czerny
 Géza von Cziffra

D 
 Gertrud David
 Hans Deppe
 Siegfried Dessauer
 William Dieterle
 Helmut Dietl
 Iain Dilthey
 Rodica Doehnert
 Solveig Dommartin
 Ferdinand Dörfler
 Doris Dörrie
 Christoph Dreher
 Michael Dreher
 Andreas Dresen (born 1963)
 Slatan Dudow
 E. A. Dupont
 Manfred Durniok
 Alfred Duskes
 Rudolf Dworsky

E 
 Uli Edel
 Jörg A. Eggers
 Richard Eichberg
 Benjamin Eicher
 Bruno Eichgrün
 Christoph Eichhorn
 Bernd Eichinger
 Heinz Emigholz
 Klaus Emmerich
 Roland Emmerich
 Erich Engel
 Erich Engels
 Ulrich Erfurth
 Erich Eriksen
 André Erkau
 Holger Ernst

F 
 Arnold Fanck
 Thomas Fantl
 Max Färberböck
 Harun Farocki (1944-2014)
 Rainer Werner Fassbinder (1945-1982)
 Rudi Fehr
 Michael Fengler
 Jan Fethke
 Andy Fetscher
 E. W. Fiedler
 Frauke Finsterwalder
 Hans Fischerkoesen
 Mika'ela Fisher
 Florian David Fitz
 Uwe Flade
 Peter Fleischmann
 Jürgen Flimm
 Marc Forster
 Lilian Franck
 Herbert B. Fredersdorf
 Thor Freudenthal
 Karl Freund
 Jochen Alexander Freydank
 Carl Froelich
 Eberhard Frowein

G 
 Florian Gallenberger (born 1972)
 Dennis Gansel
 Claudia Garde
 Katja von Garnier
 Adolf Gärtner
 Karl Gass
 Katrin Gebbe
 Hans W. Geißendörfer
 Heidi Genée
 Fritz Genschow
 Herbert Gerdes
 Kurt Gerron
 Jan-Ole Gerster (born 1978)
 Karl Peter Gillmann
 Matthias Glasner
 Niko von Glasow
 Rochus Gliese
 Vadim Glowna
 Curt Goetz
 Heinz Goldberg
 Christian Görlitz
 Peter Gorski
 Jürgen Goslar
 Dominik Graf
 Roland Gräf
 Jörg Graser
 Mutz Greenbaum
 Wolf Gremm
 Hans Grimm
 Valeska Grisebach
 Esther Gronenborn
 Philip Gröning
 Richard Groschopp
 Nina Grosse
 Gustaf Gründgens
 Bernhard Grzimek
 Michael Grzimek
 Egon Günther
 Iris Gusner
 Johannes Guter
 Michael Gwisdek

H 
 Bettina Haasen
Horst Hächler
 Lutz Hachmeister
 Rolf Hädrich
 Peter Hamel
 Hanna Henning
 Hans Hinrich
 Rolf Hansen
 Milo Harbich
 Thea von Harbou
 Thomas Harlan
 Veit Harlan
 Falk Harnack
 Reinhard Hauff
 Dietrich Haugk
 Richard Häussler
 Leander Haußmann
Karl Heiland
 Birgit Hein
 Albert Heine
 Hans Heinrich
 Thomas Heise
 Benjamin Heisenberg
 Veit Helmer
 Florian Henckel von Donnersmarck (born 1973)
 Michael Herbig
 Oliver Herbrich
 Helmut Herbst
 Hermann Kugelstadt
 Werner Herzog
 Elmar Hess
 Marianne Hettinger
 Jochen Hick
 Heinz Hille
 Heinz Hilpert
 Fritz Hippler
 Oliver Hirschbiegel
 Werner Hochbaum
 Christoph Hochhäusler
 Franz Hofer
 Hilmar Hoffmann
 Kurt Hoffmann
 Bernd Hofmann
 Sherry Hormann
 Rebecca Horn
 Hermine Huntgeburth
 George Hurdalek
 Gerhard Huttula

I 
 Olaf Ittenbach

J 
 Anja Jacobs
 Werner Jacobs
 Georg Jacoby
 Thomas Jahn
 Uwe Janson
 Björn Jensen
 Alexander Jovy
 Petra Joy
 Rudolf Jugert
 Kurt Jung-Alsen
 Gottfried Junker
 Steffen Jürgens
 Phil Jutzi

K 
 Philipp Kadelbach
 Diana Karenne
 Romuald Karmakar
 Hans-Joachim Kasprzik
 Rolf Kauka
 Helmut Käutner
 Fred Kelemen
 Otto Kelmer
 Charlotte Kerr
 Edith Kiel
 Max W. Kimmich
 Herwig Kipping
 Fritz Kirchhoff
 Ralf Kirsten
 Freya Klier
 Werner Klingler
 Alexander Kluge
 Erich Kobler
 Carl Koch
 Ulrike Koch
 Manfred R. Köhler
 Wolfgang Kohlhaase
 Lee Kohlmar
 Henry Koster
 Viktor de Kowa
 Uwe Jens Krafft
 Hans Kratzert
 Lars Kraume (born 1973)
 Chris Kraus (born 1963)
 Marco Kreuzpaintner
 Norbert Kückelmann
 Karl Georg Külb
 Joachim Kunert
 Anton Kutter

L 
 Bernd Michael Lade
 Ernst Laemmle
 Gerhard Lamprecht
 Fritz Lang (1890–1976)
 Leo Lasko
 Jakob Lass
 Erwin Leiser
 Paul Leni
 Adolf E. Licho
 Wolfgang Liebeneiner
 Peter Lilienthal
 Theo Lingen
 Caroline Link
 Alois Johannes Lippl
 Ulli Lommel
 Ralph Lothar
 Ernst Lubitsch
 Malte Ludin

M 
 Angelina Maccarone
 Max Mack
 Kurt Maetzig
 Herbert Maisch
 Farid Majari
 Anja Marquardt
 Valerie von Martens
 Karlheinz Martin
 Paul Martin
 Joe May
 Paul May
 Philipp Lothar Mayring
 Pia Mechler
 Jeanine Meerapfel
 Lothar Mendes
 Gerhard Menzel
 Ernő Metzner
 Johannes Meyer
 Rolf Meyer
 Ulf Miehe
 Tamara Milosevic
 Thomas Mitscherlich
 Hubert Moest
 Lutz Mommartz
 Hans Moser
 Armin Mueller-Stahl
 Hans Müller
 Nikolai Müllerschön
 Reinhard Münster
 F. W. Murnau

N 
 Vivian Naefe
 Werner Nekes
 Sandra Nettelbeck
 Alwin Neuß
 Erik Niedling
 Ingo Niermann
 Marcus Nispel
 Manfred Noa
 Daniel Nocke
 Rudolf Noelte
 Hans Noever
 Max Nosseck
 Till Nowak

O 
 Max Obal
 Erik Ode
 Max Ophüls
 Franz Osten
 Peter Ostermayr
 Ulrike Ottinger

P 
 Heinz Paul
 Anne-Kathrin Peitz
 Max Penzel
 Henrik Peschel
 Christian Peschken
 Wolfgang Petersen
 Ingo Petzke
 Christian Petzold
 Konrad Petzold
 Michael Pfleghar
 Harald Philipp
 Siegfried Philippi
 Lupu Pick
 Harry Piel
 Mark Poepping
 Arthur Pohl
 Ayşe Polat
 Gerhard Polt
 Franz Porten
 Rosa Porten
 Rosa von Praunheim
 Peter Przygodda
 Manfred Purzer

Q 
 Hans Quest
 Burhan Qurbani

R 
 Lola Randl
 Roland Reber
 Dirk Regel
 Willy Reiber
 Ernst Reicher
 Frank Reicher
 Max Reichmann
 Robert Reinert
 Gottfried Reinhardt
 Lotte Reiniger
 Günter Reisch
 Edgar Reitz (born 1932)
 Angela Richter
 Roland Suso Richter
 Grigorij Richters
 Ziri Rideaux
 Leni Riefenstahl (1902-2003)
 Wolf Rilla
 Otto Rippert
 Frank Ripploh
 Günther Rittau
 Karl Ritter
 Arthur Robison
 Oskar Roehler
 Michael Roes
 Jürgen Roland
 Nic Romm
 Timo Rose
 Marcus H. Rosenmüller
 Marc Rothemund
 Sigi Rothemund
 Günther Rücker
 Ottokar Runze
 Josef Rusnak
 Walter Ruttmann

S 
 Nesrin Şamdereli
 Yasemin Şamdereli
 Andreas Samland
 Enrique Sánchez Lansch
 Helke Sander
 Helma Sanders-Brahms
 Dennis Satin
 Anno Saul
 Johannes Schaaf
 Peter Schamoni
 Ulrich Schamoni
 Angela Schanelec
 Jakob Schäuffelen
 Sebastian Schipper (born 1968)
 Alfred Schirokauer
 Wolfgang Schleif
 Christoph Schlingensief
 Volker Schlöndorff
 Ludwig Schmid-Wildy
 Hans-Christian Schmid
 Jan Schmidt-Garre
 Hartmann Schmige
 Andreas Schnaas (born 1968)
 Richard Schneider-Edenkoben
 Helge Schneider
 Gregor Schnitzler
 Gunther Scholz
 Hans Schomburgk
 Walter Schönenbröcher
 Erich Schönfelder
 Hubert Schonger
 Maria Schrader
 Karl Ludwig Schröder
 Werner Schroeter
 Carl-Heinz Schroth
 Rolf Schübel
 Uli M Schueppel
 Eugen Schuhmacher
 Rudolf Schündler
 Reinhold Schünzel
 Jan Schütte
 Til Schweiger
 Hans Schweikart
 Robert Schwentke
 Mathias Schwerbrock
 Christian Schwochow
 Walter Sedlmayr
 Horst Seemann
 Markus Sehr
 Franz Seitz Jr.
 Franz Seitz Sr.
 Herbert Selpin
 Haro Senft
 Gustav von Seyffertitz
 Viola Shafik
 Lior Shamriz
 Daryush Shokof
 Andy Siege
 Robert Sigl
 María Sólrún Sigurðardóttir
 Rainer Simon
 Bernhard Sinkel
 Curt Siodmak
 Robert Siodmak
 Douglas Sirk
 Max Skladanowsky
 Franz-Josef Spieker
 The Spierig Brothers
 Zoltan Spirandelli
 Daniel Stamm
 Ivan Stanev
 Fritz Stapenhorst
 Wolfgang Staudte
 Leonard Steckel
 Francesco Stefani
 Hans Steinbichler
 Reinhart Steinbicker
 Rudolf Steiner
 Hans Steinhoff
 Thomas Stellmach
 Nicolas Stemann
 Robert A. Stemmle
 Bernhard Stephan
 Frederick Stephani
 Joe Stöckel
 Hannes Stöhr
 Philipp Stölzl
 Wenzel Storch
 Eva Stotz
 Rüdiger Sünner
 Walter Supper
 Charles Swickard
 Hans-Jürgen Syberberg

T 
 Katharina Thalbach
 Robert Thalheim
 Ulrich Thein
 Heinz Thiel
 Rolf Thiele
 Rudolf Thome
 Andrew Thorndike
 Otz Tollen
 Ludwig Trautmann
 Will Tremper
 Georg Tressler
 Monika Treut
 Margarethe von Trotta
 Adolf Trotz
 Vera Tschechowa
 Dito Tsintsadze
 Tom Tykwer

U 
 Andrei Ujică
 Fritz Umgelter

V 
 Ladislao Vajda
 Dana Vávrová
 Andres Veiel
 Michael Verhoeven
 Paul Verhoeven
 Simon Verhoeven
 Marcus Vetter
 Joseph Vilsmaier
 Volker Vogeler
 Alfred Vohrer
 Patrick Vollrath
 Achim von Borries
 David Vostell

W 
 Otto Waalkes
 Christian Wagner
 Thomas Wallner
 Werner W. Wallroth
 Gustav von Wangenheim
 Lothar Warneke
 Erich Waschneck
 William Wauer
 Marco Weber
 Paul Wegener
 Wolfgang Wehrum
 Hans Weidemann
 Alfred Weidenmann
 Helmut Weiss
 Ina Weisse
 Martin Weisz
 Manfred Wekwerth
 Arthur Wellin
 Wim Wenders
 Fritz Wendhausen
 Franz Wenzler
 Hans Werckmeister
 Constantin Werner
 Kai Wessel
 Conrad Wiene
 Robert Wiene
 Marc Wiese
 Georg Wildhagen
 Carl Wilhelm
 Adolf Winkelmann
 Franz Peter Wirth
 Frank Wisbar
 Konrad Wolf
 Carl Heinz Wolff
 Hans Wolff
 Willi Wolff
 Hans von Wolzogen
 Sönke Wortmann

Y 
 Mennan Yapo
 Özgür Yıldırım
 Eugen York

Z 
 Peter Zadek
 Peter von Zahn
 Frederic Zelnik
 Matt Zemlin
 Hans Heinz Zerlett
 Willy Zeyn
 Erich Ziegel
 Georg Zoch
 Herrmann Zschoche
 Christian Zübert

References

Lists of film directors by nationality
Film directors
Drectors